The 2016–17 Hofstra Pride men's basketball team represented Hofstra University during the 2016–17 NCAA Division I men's basketball season. The Pride, led by fourth-year head coach Joe Mihalich, played their home games at Mack Sports Complex as members of the Colonial Athletic Association. They finished the season 15–17, 7–11 in CAA play to finish in a tie for seventh place. They lost in the first round of the CAA tournament to Delaware.

Previous season
The Pride finished the 2015–16 season 24–10, 14–4 in CAA play to finish in a tie for the CAA championship with UNC Wilmington. They advanced to the championship game of the CAA tournament where they lost to UNC Wilmington. As a regular season champion who failed to win their league tournament, they received an automatic bid to the National Invitation Tournament where they lost in the first round to George Washington.

Departures

Incoming transfers

2016 recruiting class

Roster

Schedule and results

|-
!colspan=12 style=| Non-conference regular season
|-

|-
!colspan=12 style=| CAA regular season

|-
!colspan=12 style=| CAA tournament

See also
2016–17 Hofstra Pride women's basketball team

References

Hofstra Pride men's basketball seasons
Hofstra